That Animal Rescue Show is an American documentary series, which follows the animal rescue community in Austin, Texas. Richard Linklater, Bill Guttentag, and Phil McGraw serve as executive producers under their Detour Filmproduction, 1891 Productions, and Stage 29 Productions banners, respectively. It consisted of 10-episodes and premiered on October 29, 2020, on CBS All Access.

Production
In January 2020, it was announced CBS All Access had ordered a 10-episode animal rescue documentary series to be produced by Richard Linklater, Bill Guttentag and Phil McGraw under their Detour Filmproduction, 1891 Production and Stage 29 Productions banners, respectively.

References

External links
 
 

2020 American television series debuts
2020 American television series endings
2020s American documentary television series
Paramount+ original programming
Television series by CBS Studios
Television shows set in Austin, Texas
Television series about animals